Meadow Brook may refer to:


Places
Meadow Brook, New Brunswick, Canada

United States
Meadow Brook, California, in El Dorado County
Meadow Brook, Minnesota, in St. Louis County
Meadow Brook Hall, Rochester Hills, Michigan, the former Estate of Matilda Dodge Wilson
Meadow Brook Music Festival, Rochester Hills, Michigan
Meadow Brook Township, Cass County, Minnesota

Waterways
Meadow Brook (Lackawanna River tributary), a stream in Lackawanna County, Pennsylvania
Meadow Brook (Missouri), a stream in Knox County, Missouri

See also
Meadowbrook (disambiguation)